

Pierro Margaret River Vineyards (usually referred to simply as Pierro) is an Australian winery at Wilyabrup, in the Margaret River wine region of Western Australia.  Established in 1979 on a scrubby, rocky and steeply sloping property, it has been described as having "one of the prettiest locations in an area that offers much, even at its most mundane."

The winery's name, adapted from that of the folk tale character Pierrot, alludes to both the winery's founder, Dr Michael Peterkin, and its location, as both "Pierrot" and "Peterkin" mean "son of Peter" and "son of the rock".

See also

 Australian wine
 List of wineries in Western Australia
 Western Australian wine

References

Notes

Bibliography

External links
Pierro – official site

Food and drink companies established in 1979
Wilyabrup, Western Australia
Wineries in Western Australia
1979 establishments in Australia